Hessisch Oldendorf ( is a town in the Hamelin-Pyrmont district, in Lower Saxony, Germany. The adjective "Hessisch" has been used since 1905 to distinguish it from other towns named Oldendorf. Hessisch Oldendorf was part of Landgraviate of Hessen-Kassel from 1640 until 1932.

Personalities
 Heinrich Beerbom (1892–1980), mayor, city manager and honorary citizen of Bramsche
 Wilhelm Beisner (1911–?), German SD  and SS- Guide and arms dealer, agent
 Otto Deppmeyer (born 1947), politician (CDU), Member of Landtag
 Richard Krentzlin (1864–1956), died in Hessisch Oldendorf, piano teacher and composer 
 Heinrich Krone (1895–1989), politician (Centre Party, CDU) Member of the Reichstag, Member of the Bundestag 
 Ilske Laginges (–1558), the first victim of the Witch-hunt process
 Konrad Schlüsselburg (1543–1619), German Lutheran theologian
 Henrik Span (1634-1694), officer and Admiral in the Dutch, Venetian and Danish navies
 Gustav Süß (1823–1881), born in Rumbeck, painter and author of children's books
 Hans Peter Thul (born 1948), politician, (CDU) Member of Landtag and Bundestag 
 Karl Ludwig August Heino von Münchausen (1759–1836) officer in the American Revolutionary War and poet 
 Ludolph Münchausen (1570–1640), known as the scholar, collected at the time the largest and most famous library in Northern Germany
 Albert Wehrhahn (1848–1942), born in Oldendorf, school official in Hannover, a pioneer of the Special education, local historian, honorary citizen of Hessisch Oldendorf
 Ludwig Wessel (1879–1922), Protestant Pastor of St. Nicolai Church in Berlin

References 

Towns in Lower Saxony
Hameln-Pyrmont